The CANT 10 was a flying boat airliner produced in Italy in the 1920s. It was a conventional biplane design with single-bay, unstaggered wings of equal span, having seating for four passengers within the hull, while the pilot sat in an open cockpit. The engine was mounted in pusher configuration in the interplane gap.

Operational history
CANT 10 flying boats were used by Società Italiana Servizi Aerei for over a decade, linking destinations in the Adriatic Sea.Two CANT 10ters were used by a company called TAXI AEREI in Buenos Aires, operating flights from the River Plate. One of them was lost in an accident and the other one was bought by the Paraguayan government for the Naval Aviation in 1929; it was used as a transport during the Chaco War and was withdrawn from use in 1933.

Variants
 CANT 10 :
 CANT 10ter :

Operators
 
 Società Italiana Servizi Aerei (S.I.S.A.)
 
 TAXI AEREI
 
 Paraguayan Naval Aviation

Specifications

See also

References

 
 aerei-italiani.net
 Sapienza Fracchia, Antonio Luis: "La Contribución Italiana en la Aviación Paraguaya". Author's edition. Asunción, 2007. 300pp.

CANT 10
1920s Italian airliners
Flying boats
Single-engined pusher aircraft
Biplanes
Aircraft first flown in 1925